Kayal Roy Iro (born 20 February 2000) is a Cook Islands international rugby league footballer who plays as a er and  for the Cronulla-Sutherland Sharks in the NRL.

Background
Iro is the son of former player Kevin Iro and nephew of coach Tony Iro. He grew up in Rarotonga where he played for the Arorangi Bears, then moved to Auckland at age 14 and attended Mount Albert Grammar School.

Playing career

New Zealand Warriors
In 2019, Iro played for the New Zealand Warriors under 20s, before moving to the Newcastle Knights.

Newcastle Knights
On 12 November 2019, Iro signed a one-year under 20s contract with the Newcastle Knights.

Cronulla-Sutherland Sharks
In round 24 of the 2022 NRL season, Iro made his first grade debut for Cronulla in their 16-0 victory over Canterbury.

Iro won the New South Wales Cup player of the year for the 2022 NSW Cup season while playing for the Newtown Jets, the reserve grade affiliate of the Sharks.

International

Statistics

NRL
 Statistics are correct as of the end of the 2022 season

International

Notes and references

Notes

References

External links
Cronulla-Sutherland Sharks profile
Cronulla Sharks profile
New Zealand Warriors profile
Cook Islands profile

2000 births
Living people
People from Rarotonga
Cook Island rugby league players
Cook Islands national rugby league team players
Rugby league fullbacks
Cronulla-Sutherland Sharks players